The Embassy of Germany to Moldova is located in Chișinău.

References

External links 
  Deutsche Botschaft Chişinău

Germany
Chisinau
Germany–Moldova relations